Marko Saaresto (born 5 December 1970) is the founding member, lead vocalist and primary songwriter of the Finnish alternative rock band Poets of the Fall. Saaresto worked as a graphic designer before forming the band in late 2002. Sam Lake, Saaresto's friend and writer of the Max Payne series of videogames offered Saaresto a job writing the lead single for the game Max Payne 2: The Fall of Max Payne. Saaresto wrote the single along with guitarist Olli Tukiainen and were assisted with the production by Remedy engineer Markus Kaarlonen. The song, "Late Goodbye" became a cult hit and propelled Poets of the Fall's rise to stardom. Saaresto has since toured in over 15 countries with Poets of the Fall. He is a classically trained singer and has a bass-baritone vocals range. He later went on to have bigger success within the video game industry when his band and he wrote and performed for the soundtrack of Alan Wake.

Early life
Saaresto was born in Helsinki, Finland. Saaresto was actively involved in music from a very young age and wrote several of his songs as a teenager. 'Change', from the band's fourth #1 album Twilight Theater, was written by Saaresto in 1990. 'Maybe Tomorrow is a Better Day' from Carnival of Rust is even older, dating back to 1988. Saaresto took up a course in graphic design and worked as a graphic designer until he was in his early 30s.

Music career

Early career
Saaresto formed a band called Playground in 2001, and wrote several songs with them. The songs were compiled into an album but they were unable to find a label to distribute it, and hence called it quits. Playground's primary members were Saaresto and Pohjoinen Syke jazz guitarist Olli Tukianen.
One late evening in early 2002, Saaresto was approached by Sam Lake, the writer of the Max Payne series of videogames to write the lead single for the second installment in the series, Max Payne 2: The Fall of Max Payne. Saaresto agreed. Lake gave Saaresto a poem he had written and asked him to make a song out of it. Saaresto modified it, and along with former Playground bandmate Tukiainen, wrote the now-famous single Late Goodbye. To assist them with production, Lake offered them the services of industrial musician Markus 'Captain' Kaarlonen. Together they recorded the song and upon the release of the game, the song garnered cult status. Thousands of requests were made by players all around the world to own a physical copy of the song. They then decided to formally create the band and named it 'Poets of the Fall'.

2004–2005

With the huge success of their song, Saaresto decided to create their own record label, Insomniac, and distribute it under that label in association with a bigger label. 'Late Goodbye' was released on 30 June 2004 and rocketed to #14 on the Finnish charts. With clamors for another song, Poets of the Fall wrote and recorded 'Lift' and released it as a single on 9 September 2004. Lift rose even more, reaching a high of #8 on the Finnish music charts and remaining in the top 20 for 11 straight weeks.

With a few more songs being written, Poets of the Fall decided to release their first studio album, Signs of Life. It was released on 19 January 2005 in Finland and reached #1 within a week of release. It stayed on the charts for over 50 weeks. Signs of Life was a huge commercial and critical success, winning the Emma Award for Best Debut Album, and ranking #7 on RadioCity's Album of the Year contest.
Signs of Life was certified platinum by the IFPI and Poets of the Fall won the Best Newcomer Award at Emma Gaala.
The songs 'Stay' and 'Illusion and Dream' were used as radio-promo singles. Two music videos accompanied the album, one for Late Goodbye and one for Lift, directed by Stobe Harju. Saaresto envisioned and designed both videos and stars in them.

2006–2007

Poets of the Fall won the Best Breakthrough Award at the NRJ Radio Awards in late 2005. The band released their third single, Carnival of Rust on 22 March 2006. The single remains the band's best-selling and most famous song to date, topping out at #2 on the Finnish charts. The band's second studio album, Carnival of Rust was released on 12 April 2006 and immediately went to #1 on the charts, staying in the top 40 for 26  It was nominated for several awards and named 'Album of the Year'. The music videos from this album were 'Locking up the Sun' and 'Carnival of Rust', both directed by Stobe Harju and envisioned by Saaresto. The latter is considered one of the greatest music videos of all time, being named 'the best music video in Finland's history' by Musiikki-TV, garnering 7 times more votes than the runner-up.

References

Finnish baritones
1970 births
Living people
Finnish bass-baritones
21st-century Finnish  male singers